This is a list of members of the Victorian Legislative Council between 1934 and 1937. As half of the Legislative Council's terms expired at each triennial election, half of these members were elected at the 1931 triennial election with terms expiring in 1937, while the other half were elected at the 1934 triennial election with terms expiring in 1940.

 On 12 February 1935, Alfred Chandler, UAP MLC for South Eastern Province, died. His son, UAP candidate Gilbert Chandler, won the resulting by-election in March 1935.
 On 23 February 1935, Albert Zwar, Country MLC for North Eastern Province, died. Country candidate Percival Inchbold won the resulting by-election in April 1935.
 On 25 November 1935, Herbert Smith, UAP MLC for Melbourne Province, died. UAP candidate George Wales won the resulting by-election in May 1936.
 In February 1935, Harold Cohen, UAP MLC for Melbourne South Province, resigned to contest Caulfield in the 1935 Assembly election. UAP candidate Archibald Crofts won the resulting by-election in March 1935.
 On 17 August 1936, Martin McGregor, UAP MLC for Gippsland Province, died. Country candidate James Miller Balfour won the resulting by-election in October 1936.

Sources
 Re-member (a database of all Victorian MPs since 1851). Parliament of Victoria.

Members of the Parliament of Victoria by term
20th-century Australian politicians